Walimuni Solias Mendis  (June 17, 1897 – September 1, 1975) was a renowned Sri Lankan artist primarily known for his Buddhist temple paintings, accomplished in a neo-classical style.

A native of Mahawewa, Madampe in Sri Lanka, second of seven boys in the family, Mendis was intended by his parents to become an Ayurveda Physician, but he was drawn to art. In his early years, he worked and trained alongside his uncle Memonis Silva, himself a master painter. Once accomplished himself, he began painting murals in Buddhist temples. Later such as Rannasgalla Vihara and Maddepola Vihara.The Buddhist monks and devotees who saw magnificent style decided to call him to paint in Kelani Vihara. In order to increase his skills Mendis visited India to examine the works of Ajanta Caves, Ellora Caves, Bagh Caves and Sarnath, which inspired him to mingle the techniques of Indian Buddhist art with the traditions of Sinhalese classical art, eschewing the then prevalent European traditions. At around the age of 30, he undertook a twenty-year project to complete the Kelaniya Vihara murals. His style was unique, from graceful brush strokes to perspective.

References

External links
 A Genius Of Art Solias Mendis
Home/sri lanka/Painting
Wall Paintings in Kaleniya Temple by Solias Mendis

Gallery of Solias Mendis paintings at Kelaniya

1897 births
1975 deaths
20th-century Sri Lankan painters